The Haima Familia M5 is a compact sedan produced in China since 2014 for the model year 2015 under the Familia (福美来) product series within the Haima brand and sold alongside the similarly sized Haima M6.

Overview 

Originally launched as the third generation Haima Family sedan, the model was later renamed to Haima Familia M5, replacing the Haima 3 or Haima Family compact cars. 

Debuting in late 2013 and officially launched in May 2014, the price range of the Haima Familia M5 ranges from 74,900 yuan to 118,900 yuan.

Powertrain
The Haima M5 is available with two then-new engines including a 1.6-litre engine with 125hp and 151nm, and a 1.5-litre turbo engine with 160hp and 210nm. The 1.6-litre engine is mated to a 6-speed manual transmission or a 6-speed automatic transmission, while the 1.5-litre turbo engine is only available with the 6-speed automatic transmission.

2017 facelift

The Haima M5 received a facelift in September 2016 for the 2017 model year changing mainly the front and rear bumpers and front grilles along with interior multimedia infotainment system updates. The car has currently been sold as the Haima Familia F5 since 2018.

References

External links 

 Haima official website
 Haima Familia series website 

Haima vehicles
Compact cars
Sedans
Front-wheel-drive vehicles
Cars introduced in 2013
Cars of China